Macromolecular Materials and Engineering is a monthly peer-reviewed scientific journal covering polymer science. It publishes Reviews, Feature Articles, Communications, and Full Papers on design, modification, characterization, and processing of advanced polymeric materials. Published topics include materials research on engineering polymers, tailor-made functional polymer systems, and new polymer additives. According to the Journal Citation Reports, the journal has a 2020 impact factor of 4.367.

References

External links 
 

Chemistry journals
Materials science journals
Publications established in 2000
English-language journals
Wiley-VCH academic journals
Monthly journals